Vernadskii Ridge is a volcanic group located in the northern part of Paramushir Island, Kuril Islands, Russia. It is named after Russian scientist Vladimir Vernadsky. The Vernadskii Ridge together with Ebeko is one of the volcanoes on Paramushir that have erupted after the last glacial age, and both of them form one of Paramushir's volcanic ridges; during the last ice age glaciers from the Vernadskii Ridge merged the island with Shumshu island. Metasomatic alteration of country rock has taken place.

See also
 List of volcanoes in Russia

Footnotes

References 
 

Paramushir
Cinder cones
Volcanic groups
Volcanoes of the Kuril Islands
Mountains of the Kuril Islands
Holocene volcanoes
Holocene Asia